Gateway is the seventh extended play by South Korean boy group Astro. It was released on May 4, 2020, by Fantagio Music and distributed by Kakao M. The album contains six songs including the lead single "Knock". This is their third number one album in South Korea.

Reception 
The group re-entered the Emerging Artists chart at number 49. Upon the release of Gateway, Billboard reported that the sextet gained 75,000 new YouTube subscribers, 24,000 new Twitter followers and 6,000 new Facebook page followers. The biggest music move Astro made was with new single "Knock" logging 312,000 on-demand US streams, in its first week available.

Commercial performance 
The album debuted atop the Gaon Album Chart for the week ending May 9, 2020. It also debuted at number 38 on Billboard Japan's Hot Albums for the week ending May 18, 2020, and at number 15 on Top Download Albums. It also debuted at number 3 on the Oricon Albums Chart with 11,459 copies sold and peaked at number 3 on the Oricon Combined Albums Chart.

Track listing

Charts

Accolades

See also
 List of Gaon Album Chart number ones of 2020

References 

2020 EPs
Astro (South Korean band) albums